Snidely Whiplash is a fictional character who originally appeared as the main antagonist in the Dudley Do-Right of the Mounties segments of the animated television series The Rocky and Bullwinkle Show.  He is the archenemy of Dudley Do-Right. He was listed among the 100 greatest characters in television animation.

The character was voiced by Hans Conried in the original cartoon series. Alfred Molina played Whiplash in the 1999 live-action film version Dudley Do-Right.

Whiplash is the stereotypical villain in the style of stock characters found in silent films and earlier stage melodrama, wearing black clothing and a top hat and with a handlebar moustache. Whiplash's henchman, Homer, usually wears a tuque. In the cartoon's opening segments, Whiplash is seen tying Nell Fenwick to a railroad track. Whiplash is obsessed with tying young women to railroad tracks; he has no reason to do so and realizes no gain, profit or advantage, but is simply compelled to do it. He is the antithesis of Do-Right, who is the archetype of goodness and a Royal Canadian Mounted Policeman (RCMP). On one occasion, typical of producer Jay Ward's sense of humor, Whiplash and Do-Right changed hats; Do-Right became the criminal supervillain who actually succeeds at crime and Whiplash became the RCMP hero for capturing the evil Do-Right. This role reversal is repeated in the 1999 film adaptation.

References

Villains in animated television series
Comedy film characters
Fictional Canadian people
Fictional characters with obsessive–compulsive disorder
Fictional con artists
Fictional gamblers
Fictional gangsters
Fictional outlaws
Fictional thieves
Male characters in animation
Male film villains
Rocky and Bullwinkle characters
Television characters introduced in 1961
Film supervillains